Miss International 2014, the 54th Miss International pageant, organized by the International Cultural Association held on November 11, 2014 at the Grand Prince Hotel Takanawa in Tokyo, Japan. Bea Santiago of the Philippines crowned her successor Valerie Hernández of Puerto Rico at the end of the event.

Miss International beauty pageant is aimed at promoting "Love Peace and Excitement to the World". The contestants of the pageant are expected to serve as "Ambassadors of Peace and Beauty", serving tenderness, generosity, friendship, beauty, intelligence and a great international sensibility.

The pageant was hosted by Tetsuya Bessho.

Background 

On January 25, 2014, it was announced by Akemi Shimomura, this is the first consecutive year that the 2014 pageant will be held in Grand Prince Hotel Takanawa, Tokyo, Japan on Tuesday, November 11, 2014.

Results

Special awards

Judges
 Shin Koyamada – Hollywood actor and film producer (The Last Samurai, Wendy Wu: Homecoming Warrior), Chairperson of Koyamada Foundation
 Yuriko Koike – House of Representatives of Japan, Former Minister of Defense, Former Minister of the Environment
 Bea Santiago – Miss International 2013 from Philippines
 Yuki Ikenobou – Tiantai Buddhist Monk
 Soujitsu Kobori – Enshu Sado School Grand Master
 Jennifer Hintnaus – Zumba Instructor in Hawaii
 Junko Koshino – Fashion designer
 Yuichi Hasegawa – Animator (Dead or Alive 4)
 Mariko Bando – President of Showa Women's University
 Manu Virtamo – Finland Ambassador to Japan
 Shohei Miyata – President of Tokyo University of the Arts
 Gaku Muta – President of Japanese Management Consultants Association
 Yoshihiro Murata – Chief Chef & Owner of Kikunoi, Kyoto Kaiseki Cuisine
 Akemi Shimomura – Chair of International Cultural Association, the Organizer

Contestants

Notes

Returns

Last competed in 1962:
 
Last competed in 2002:
 
Last competed in 2007:
 
 
Last competed in 2008:
 
Last competed in 2010:
 
 
 
Last competed in 2011:
 
 
Last competed in 2012:

Withdrawals

Designations
  – Josefina José Herrero was appointed as Miss International Argentina 2014 by Belleza Argentina Organization to mark Argentina return since in 2013 Argentina withdrew with Zaida Schoop, due to lack of funding and sponsorships to compete. Josefina was Miss Mundo Argentina 2012.
  – Francis Massiel Sousa was appointed as Miss International Aruba 2014 by Senorita Aruba Organization. This official candidate was coming from Senorita Aruba 2013 (first session). She was Senorita Aruba 2013 1st runner-up.
  – Deise Benicio is 2nd runner-up in Miss Brasil 2014.
  – Kesiah Papasin was appointed as Miss International Canada 2014. She is Miss Universe Canada 2014 1st runner-up.
  – Perihan Fateen was appointed as Miss International Egypt 2014. She was a Top 10 finalist in Miss Egypt 2014.
  – Inga Tsaturiani wa appointed as Miss International Georgia 2014. She was Miss Friendship at Miss 7 Continents 2011.
  – Ruqayyah Boyer was appointed as Miss International Guyana 2014 by National Director, Natasha Martaindale to mark Guyana's return at Miss International. She was Miss Guyana 2012.
  – Shani Hazan was appointed as Miss International Israel 2014 by Miss International Israel Organization. She was Miss World Israel 2012.
  – Vianey Vázquez as appointed as Miss Mexico International 2014 by Nuestra Belleza México
  – Shauny Built was appointed as Miss International Netherlands 2014. She was Miss Earth Netherlands 2012.
  – Lidija Kocić was appointed as Miss International Serbia 2014. She was Miss Universe Serbije 2010.
  – Punika Kunsuntornrat was appointed as Miss International Thailand 2014. She was Miss Earth Thailand 2013.

Replacements
  – Inés Panchana did not compete at Miss International, since she failed to meet the age requirements stipulated by the pageant. Carla Pardo was appointed to compete at Miss International 2014, She is Miss Ecuador 2014 2nd runner-up.
  – The reigning Miss Myanmar International 2014, Khin Wai Phyo Han did not compete at Miss International, since she failed to meet the age requirements stipulated by the pageant. May Bayani Thaw was appointed to compete at Miss International 2014, She is Miss Myanmar International 2014 1st runner-up.
  – Patricia Quiñones did not compete at Miss International, Valerie Hernandez was appointed to compete at Miss International 2014.
  – The reigning Miss International Turkey 2014, Gizem Koçak has resigned her title. Hilal Yabuz replaced Gizem for undisclosed reasons. Hilal Yabuz was appointed from the Miss Turkey 2014 Contestants selection.

References

External links
 Miss International official website

2014
2014 beauty pageants
Beauty pageants in Japan
2014 in Tokyo